The 2015–16 Sydney Sixers season is the club's fifth consecutive season in the Big Bash League (BBL). After losing in the final of the 2014–15 Big Bash League season to Perth Scorchers, the Sixers had originally qualified for the T20 Champions League. However, this tournament was cancelled due to lack of spectator and sponsorship interest. In the BBL, the club finished last during the regular season, recording only two wins from eight matches.

Players

Squad
Players with international caps are listed in bold.

Big Bash League

Ladder

Results by round

Matches

Home attendance

References

External links
Official site

Sydney Sixers seasons